Philip Banchong Chaiyara C.Ss.R. (born January 30, 1945, Thai ฟิลิป บรรจง ไชยรา) is the bishop of the Roman Catholic diocese of Ubon Ratchathani, Thailand.

Born in Chang Ming (Phanna Nikhom district, Sakon Nakhon Province), he became a member of the Congregation of the Most Holy Redeemer on August 2, 1969. He studied philosophy at the Holy Redeemer College in Waterford, Wisconsin and theology at Mount St. Alphonsus Seminary at Esopus, New York. On June 12, 1975 he was ordained as priest. 1976-78 he worked as parish priest at the Nongkhai Mission, Diocese of Udon Thani; 1979-81 he was rector of the Redemptorist Seminary Minor at Si Racha; 1981-87 parish priest at the Holy Redeemer Church in Bangkok; 1987-92 parish priest at Bannoi, Khonkaen, Udon Thani diocese; 1993-2002 director of Social Work at Pattaya, Diocese of Chanthaburi. Since 2005 he also was parish priest at St. Nikolaus, Pattaya, Chanthaburi diocese.

On March 25, 2006 he was appointed as the new bishop of the diocese of Ubon Ratchathani.

References

External links
Fides press release about his appointment
Catholic hierarchy

21st-century Roman Catholic bishops in Thailand
Redemptorist bishops
1945 births
Living people
Philip Banchong Chaiyara